St Stephen's Church, Woodville is a Grade II listed parish church in the Church of England in Woodville, Derbyshire.

History

The desire for a church in Woodville was first expressed at a meeting on St Stephen's day in 1843, and this prompted the construction of the church, and the dedication was selected based on the day of that initial meeting.

The church was built on a one-acre plot of land given by Barbara Rawdon-Hastings, Marchioness of Hastings to the designs of the architect Henry Isaac Stevens. The corner stone was laid on 7 November 1845 by Richard Curzon-Howe, 1st Earl Howe, in the presence of Hon. Capt. Curzon and the Rev. Marmaduke Vavasour. Transept arches were built into the walls to provide for any future enlargement. The apse was laid with Minton black, buff and red encaustic tiles.

It was consecrated by the Bishop of Peterborough, Rt. Revd. George Davys on 8 December 1846.

Parish status
The church is in a joint parish with
St Margaret's Church, Blackfordby

Organ
A pipe organ was built by Albert E Pease. A specification of the organ can be found on the National Pipe Organ Register.

See also
Listed buildings in Woodville, Derbyshire

References

Woodville
Woodville
Religious buildings and structures completed in 1846